Chrysophyllum argenteum is a tree in the family Sapotaceae, native to the tropical Americas.

Description
Larger trees may feature buttresses. Its grey bark is fissured. Fascicles feature up to 10 cream to green flowers.

Distribution and habitat
Chrysophyllum argenteum is native to a wide area from the Caribbean to Central America and tropical South America.

References

argenteum
Flora of South America
Plants described in 1760
Taxa named by Nikolaus Joseph von Jacquin